Special police usually describes a police force or unit within a police force whose duties and responsibilities are significantly different from other forces in the same country or from other police in the same force, although there is no consistent international definition. A special constable, in most cases, is not a member of a special police force (SPF); in countries in the Commonwealth of Nations and often elsewhere, a special constable is a voluntary or part-time member of a national or local police force or a person involved in law enforcement who is not a police officer but has some of the powers of a police officer.

Australia

Australian police forces have a unit which carries out high risk jobs. They use heavier fire power and better vehicles. They go by different names: Special Tasks and Rescue group, Security Response Section and Special Operations Group.

Canada

"Special police" is not a term used in Canada, but specialized police agencies exist in Alberta, British Columbia, Nova Scotia, and Ontario.

In Alberta, special police forces can be maintained by transit authorities and universities and are usually referred to as protective services. Protective services are staffed by unarmed community peace officers who have law enforcement powers but cannot enforce criminal legislation.

In British Columbia, any provincially-approved entity or First Nation can establish a designated policing unit (DPU) to supplement "the policing and law enforcement otherwise provided by the provincial police force or a municipal police department." Although officers of a DPU are armed police officers with the same authority as any other municipal police officer, designated policing units must comply with stricter regulations compared to municipal police services and are led by a Chief Officer, who has less authority over their staff than an ordinary police chief. As of 2022, there are three designated policing units in the province: the Metro Vancouver Transit Police, which provides police services to TransLink, the regional transit provider in the Vancouver metropolitan area; the Organized Crime Agency of British Columbia, which is responsible for investigating and prosecuting organized crime rings; and the Stlʼatlʼimx Tribal Police Service, which serves ten St'at'imc communities in the northern end of the Squamish-Lillooet Regional District.

There is one special police force in Nova Scotia, the Halifax-Dartmouth Bridge Commission Bridge Patrol. The Patrol is composed of special constables with limited police authority to enforce traffic violations on or near Bridge Commission property.

In Ontario, any organization can request the authority to raise a special constabulary from the local police services board. With some exceptions, officers employed by special constabularies do not carry guns and cannot refer to themselves as police. In general, special constables in Ontario employed by special constabularies have full police powers — including the ability to enforce the Criminal Code — but only on, between, or in relation to property owned by the organization that is responsible for the special constabulary. As of 2022, there is one special constabulary with armed employees, the Niagara Parks Police Service, which is responsible for providing police services to property owned or maintained by the Niagara Parks Commission. Special constabularies are also maintained by universities, transit systems, and public housing authorities.

China
In the People's Republic of China, the Special Police Units are the local equivalent of the U.S. SWAT teams. They are tasked with duties that normal patrol officers are not sufficiently equipped to handle, such as riot control and hostage situations. In addition, the Beijing Special Weapons and Tactics Unit and Snow Leopard Commando Unit also fulfill different duties.

Croatia

In Croatia, Special Police serve as special operations forces trained primarily for anti-terrorism operations. Unlike many western SWAT teams, Croatian Special Police officers are full-time, professional operators with no secondary duties. A total of four Special Police units exist in cities of Osijek, Rijeka, Split and Zagreb covering their respective regions. A fifth and most elite unit, ATJ Lučko is stationed in Zagreb and has jurisdiction over the entire country.

Former Yugoslavia

The Special Police were a branch of the Regular Police who were used for restoring peace and stability if it had been heavily disturbed, counter-terrorism, countering violent groups, and repressing riots (especially in prisons). The Special Police also provided security and public peace, investigated and prevented organized crime, terrorism and other violent groups; protected state and private property; and helped and assisted civilians and other emergency forces in cases of emergency, natural disasters, civil unrest and armed conflicts.

Greece
The term "Special (Police) Guards" describes a special class of police personnel, employed on a 5-year contract to supplement regular police officers. The idea for the creation of the category is attributed to Michalis Chrisochoidis and Chief Ioannis Georgakopoulos and was realised in 1999. Special Guards number 2,000 out of the 65,000-strong force.

The unit and its operators protect the Greek citizens from acts of terrorism, including but not limited to bombings, kidnappings and hijackings.

The Hellenic Coast Guard has a similar, tier 1 counterterrorist commando unit, called Unit for Submarine Missions (ΜΥΑ).

Hong Kong

Hong Kong has a number of special units.

Indonesia
Special police in Indonesia are Agricultural and Animal Quarantine Police, Forestry Police, Municipal Police, Prison Police, Railroad Police and Special Police for Management of Marine, Coastal Region and Remote Islands.

Indonesian National Police also have their own special police units, which are: 
Mobile Brigade Corps also known as "BRIMOB" is the Special Operations Force, Police Commandos, Special Response team, Paramilitary, and riot control unit of the National Police Force of Indonesia (POLRI). 
GEGANA is an internal special unit of "BRIMOB" which conducts mainly on bomb disposal and counter-terrorist operations. It also specializes in the field of handling of chemical, biological, and radiological threats.
DENSUS 88 / Detasmen Khusus 88 translated as ("Detachment 88") is the special counter-terrorism force of the Indonesian National Police.

Ireland
Units of Ireland's national police force, the Garda Síochána, which have specialist areas of responsibility include the Garda Crime & Security Branch, Garda Special Detective Unit, Garda Emergency Response Unit, Garda National Surveillance Unit, and Garda Armed Support Units.

Other specialist policing units in Ireland include the Airport Police Service, Dublin Harbour Police, Dún Laoghaire Harbour Police and Military Police Corps.

Israel

Many functions ordinarily taken by special police units, are also taken by the Israeli special forces units.

Yamam, one of the four special operations units of the Israel Border Police
Yamas, special operations unit of the Israel Border Police, directly subordinate to Shin Bet

Italy
Gruppo di Intervento Speciale
Nucleo Operativo Centrale di Sicurezza
Raggruppamento Operativo Speciale

Malaysia

Pasukan Gerakan Khas (PGK) 
69 Commando (VAT69) 
Special Actions Unit (UTK)

New Zealand
"Special Police" is a term actively used in New Zealand.  Aside from the New Zealand Police, special powers are derived in legislation for customs officers, Fisheries Officers, and also Fire Police.  The Fire Police hold the full legal powers of a Police Constable when on official duty; Customs Officers, Fishery Officers, Aviation Security Officers, have limited powers (including the power to arrest or detain) in particular circumstances.

Sri Lanka
The Special Task Force is a special police unit that is somewhat equal to the US SWAT teams, however they have broader responsibilities such as Counter-Terrorism, VVIP protection, bomb and EID disposal, etc.

Sweden
Nationella Insatsstyrkan
Piketen

Taiwan
Special police in Republic of China (Taiwan) includes Thunder Squad of municipal governments (local police departments), Peace Enforcing Special Service Forces aka "Wei-An" Forces of Ministry of the Interior, and Military Police Special Services Company Code-named Night Hawk of Ministry of National Defense.

The 7th Special Police was a unit of the National Police Agency and later evolved into what is now the Republic of China Coast Guard.

Turkey
Police Special Operation Department
Gendarmerie Special Operations
Gendarmerie Special Public Security Command
Maritime Search and Security Operations Team

Northern Cyprus 

 TRNC Special Operation Department

United Kingdom

In the United Kingdom, special police force has a special meaning in law and describes one of the forces defined as such in legislation including:

 Serious Organised Crime and Police Act 2005
 Police, Public Order and Criminal Justice (Scotland) Act 2006
 Police and Justice Act 2006

These are managed by government departments other than the Home Office, and have duties and responsibilities associated with particular legal or illegal activities rather than the geographical areas which are served by a single territorial police force.

There are three such forces:
 British Transport Police: Responsible for policing the rail network in Great Britain.
 Civil Nuclear Constabulary: Non-military nuclear installations and non-military nuclear material in transit.
 Ministry of Defence Police: Ministry of Defence property, personnel, other defence interests, UK nuclear weapons and special nuclear materials.

The National Crime Agency (whose full powers are limited to England and Wales) is not a police force but an agency responsible to a Secretary of State; however, officers are 'triple warranted' – with powers of a police officer, immigration officer and customs officer.

Special police can also be used in terms of special constables, who are volunteers who have the same powers of arrest as a regular/full time police constable.

United States
In United States terminology, special police can mean:
Auxiliary, reserve, or special police; members of volunteer, unpaid or paid, part-time unit of a larger, full-service law enforcement agency (such as the NYPD Auxiliary)
Company or private police
Fire police
SWAT
Security police or private security officers granted law enforcement authority
State- or jurisdiction-specific variations of ‘special police officer,’ such as Massachusetts’ ‘Special State Police Officer,’ or Kentucky and New Jersey’s ‘Special Law Enforcement Officer

While no single definition of ‘special police’ prevails across the United States, it is typically understood to mean either a law enforcement agency working for a unique jurisdiction (such as a hospital or park) or a law enforcement officer whose authority, training, and experience may differ somewhat from a ‘regular’ law enforcement officer (LEO).

The term can also refer to limited police power granted in some jurisdictions to lifeguards, SPCA personnel, teachers, and other public sector employees which is incidental to their main responsibilities.

The specific powers granted to special police officers vary widely from state to states and sometimes within a single state. Some states, such as Maryland, New York, and the District of Columbia, grant full police/peace officer authority to SPOs for use in whatever area they are employed to protect. They may make traffic stops in their jurisdiction if they have had accredited training. They are also permitted to conduct traffic control and investigations pertaining to the area protected by them.

In some jurisdictions, SPOs may be granted only limited arrest authority in specific circumstances, while in still other jurisdictions, SPOs are granted no more authority than an otherwise private citizen could exercise in effecting a citizen’s arrest. Many jurisdictions permit SPOs to carry a firearm (some even while off-duty, with some SPOs being covered under LEOSA), but some are not permitted to do so. Even in the latter case, however, they are typically permitted to carry at least  OC spray (pepper spray), a baton, and/or handcuffs.

Some SPOs are permitted to conduct traffic stops. In these cases, the SPOs typically (although not always) hold ‘full’ police powers. SPOs that are primarily responsible for law enforcement in a given jurisdiction (such as hospital or campus police) are more likely to hold this authority than, for example, an SPO working for a municipality’s law enforcement agency as an auxiliary law enforcement officer.

Uniforms of SPOs also vary widely. SPOs that hold no or limited police authority are typically uniformed in a manner that makes it immediately apparent that they are not ‘regular’ law enforcement. This may range from distinctly different color uniforms than what local regular LEOs wear to some sort of patch or badge clearly identifying them as ‘special,’ ‘reserve,’ or ‘auxiliary’ LEOs. SPOs whom hold ‘full’ law enforcement authority typically wear uniforms that are similar to other local LEOs. While individual departments are usually given a wide latitude in the wear of their uniforms, some states have specific laws, codes, or regulations that require special police to be clearly identified as such.

California
The San Francisco Patrol Special Police is a neighborhood police force authorized in the City Charter, with officers appointed and regulated by the Police Commission after an initial security review by the San Francisco Police Department. Hourly rates for service are principally paid by private clients, with some cost to the city for general program administration concerning standards of professional performance, but not concerning day-to-day operations. Thus, the nature of this special police force is both quasi-private and quasi-public. The force has been in operation in the United States, city of San Francisco for over 162 years. By current City Code the force provides patrols on the streets of San Francisco as well as at fixed locations, and also provides a range of other safety services as requested by private clients.

Kentucky
In Kentucky, special police officers are Special Law Enforcement Officers (SLEO). They are sworn peace officers with limited jurisdiction. They have full legal police powers; explicitly including arrest authority, the ability to carry a weapon, and use emergency vehicles. However, their jurisdiction is specifically limited to public property that they have been hired to protect. While Kentucky law allows both the State and local governments to use SLEO's, most are used by the Kentucky State Police in the Facilities Security Branch.

Massachusetts
Within the Commonwealth of Massachusetts, ‘special police’ usually refers to Special State Police Officers (SSPOs) whom are law enforcement officers typically employed by a college, university, or hospital police force. SSPOs must attend and graduate either the 16-week SSPO Academy hosted by the Massachusetts State Police (MSP) in New Braintree, Massachusetts, or any of the 20-week Recruit Officer Courses (the same academies attended by municipal LEOs across the commonwealth) approved by the Municipal Police Training Council (MPTC). Prospective SSPOs may have the training requirement waived by the Massachusetts State Police if they have completed an MPTC-approved Reserve/Intermittent Academy, have worked at least 2,000 hours as a part-time LEO, and have an associate’s degree or higher in criminal justice; SSPO candidates whom have a significant full-time LE work history and have previously completed any LE academy may also apply for a training waiver from the MSP. SSPOs typically have the same police powers as ‘regular’ police officers within the commonwealth, although they may only exercise it pursuant to their duties and usually only while on their employer’s property.

Officers and investigators of the Massachusetts Department of Correction (MADOC) and parole officers of the Massachusetts Parole Board (MPB) are also authorized to be sworn as SSPOs upon recommendation by the MADOC commissioner or chairman of the Massachusetts Parole Board, respectively, given they meet SSPO training requirements. Like other SSPOs, they may only exercise their police powers while on-duty and pursuant to their specific duties. MADOC SSPOs are permitted to exercise their police powers in and around Massachusetts penal institutions, while transporting prisoners, and in order to prevent a prisoner from escaping. Both MADOC and MPB SSPOs are permitted to serve warrants issued by the governor, the MADOC commissioner or by the MPB chairman. MPB SSPOs may also execute warrants issued by Massachusetts courts. MPB SSPOs may also arrest parolees that have violated their parole conditions or have committed a crime before the parole officer, and have full police powers when assisting a ‘regular’ police officer. Probation officers of the Massachusetts Probation Service are, unlike parole officers, not sworn as SSPOs. Instead, Massachusetts General Law specifically empowers them as ‘regular’ police officers whom may exercise such authority throughout the commonwealth, and are required to attend a Probation Service academy.

Locally, some towns and cities may use the term ‘special police officer’ to refer to reserve/part-time members of their police departments, such as in Wellesley and Lincoln, MA. If they are sworn, the state requires all special police officers to complete 372.5 hours of training, with an additional 56 hours for those carrying a firearm, the same as other part-time or reserve officers in Massachusetts.

There are also a plethora of ‘special police officers’ whom work in the city of Boston; these officers either work directly for the city (Boston School Police, Boston Municipal Protective Services, Boston Public Health Commission Police, Boston Housing Authority Police, or Boston Fire Department arson investigators) or for private security and armored car companies. The city of Boston required these agencies to attend a Boston Police Department-approved academy which was a minimum of 160 training hours. However, as of 1 July 2021, Most Boston special police officers were stripped of their police powers and the automatic right to carry a firearm on-duty, due to the passage of Massachusetts bill S.2963. The bill requires anyone exercising police powers, including Boston special police officers, to have graduated from an MPTC-approved academy or the MSP-sponsored SSPO Academy; The city of Boston is still permitted to issue special police officer licenses, but prospective officers must meet the aforementioned requirements. As of September 2021, only 6 licenses had been re-issued, all to Boston Housing Authority special police officers.

Special police officers and SSPOs whom work for a ‘public agency,’ (i.e. any state or municipal agency, school, or hospital) and are authorized to carry firearms on-duty, qualify to carry a firearm concealed, off-duty, anywhere in the United States, as per the Law Enforcement Officers Safety Act. This act does not grant any additional police authority to individuals that fall under it. Individuals employed by private agencies, i.e. security companies, private schools, or private hospitals, do not qualify for LEOSA protections, even if they are sworn SSPOs whom are authorized to carry a firearm on-duty.

New Jersey
In New Jersey, ‘special police’ generally refers to ‘Special Law Enforcement Officers’ (SLEOs), whom are typically utilized to supplement full-time ‘regular’ police officers. As codified within New Jersey state law, there are currently three classes of SLEOs, divided into ‘Class I,’ ‘Class II,’ and ‘Class III.’

Class I SLEOs are allowed to conduct routine traffic detail, spectator control, and similar duties, but are not authorized to carry a firearm while on duty. Such SLEOs are required to attend and graduate a state-approved ‘Class I academy.’

Class II SLEOs must attend a state-approved ‘Class II academy’ and are afforded full police powers while on-duty. They are authorized to carry a firearm.

Class III SLEOs are retired fully trained police officers who are under the age of 65 years old. They serve on a part-time basis and authorized to provide security while on school or college premises during hours when the school or college is normally in session or when occupied by students, teachers, or professors. These Officers do not replace regular law enforcement officers or school resource officers currently employed in schools.

By law, all armed SLEOs must return their firearm to the station house unless the firearm is owned by the SLEO in compliance with unit policy on personally owned firearms. All Class II and Class III SLEOs are fully trained and certified police officers in the State of New Jersey. Class I SLEOs go through different certifications, but still have police officer status. Class Two Officers in Newark carry weapons off duty.

New Orleans, Louisiana
The Superintendent of the New Orleans Police Department in accordance with New Orleans Home Rule Charter section 4-502 (2) (a) (b) and New Orleans Municipal Code 17271 MCS 90–86, may deputize private Security Guards, within the city limits, with limited Police Power as New Orleans Police Special Officers. Louisiana R.S. 40:1379.1 (b) states the Special Officer, when performing those tasks requiring a Special Officer's commission, shall have the same powers and duties as a Peace Officer, however, that when not performing these tasks directly related to the special officer's commission, he shall be regarded as a private citizen and his commission shall not be in effect. Special Officers may make arrest for felony or misdemeanor offenses on the property or area they are to protect, patrol, or in relation to their direct assignment. However, Special Officers still may make an arrest, as a private person, for a felony, whether in or out of his presence, under Louisiana Law CCRP Art.214 Arrest by private person; when lawful.

North Carolina
In North Carolina, some private companies have their own special police forces. These include hospitals, hotels, race tracks, and shopping malls and are more properly referred to as "Company Police". There are also companies that offer contract special police services for a fee to anyone who has property they wish to protect. In the state of North Carolina, special police differ greatly from security companies. North Carolina Special police officers have full arrest powers on any property they are hired to protect within the state as granted by the North Carolina Attorney General. Special police officers must also attend and pass the Basic Law Enforcement Training program like all other police officers. Security officers do not have arrest powers as their job is to mainly observe and report.

Oregon
Historically, Oregon had many more special police officers than the state does presently, beginning in the 19th century. While the roles they served have largely been replaced by more conventional law enforcement officers, some special police officers and the authorities for commissioning them remain. For instance, under Oregon law, mayors or similar officials who oversee a municipal water supply system are permitted to appoint special police officers which possess police powers for the purposes of maintaining the purity of drinking water. The regional government Metro appoints special police for the purposes of enforcing parking laws and codes. The city of Portland also commissions special police officers for this purpose.

Smithsonian Museum Special Police in NY, Virginia, & DC

The Smithsonian museum utilizes federal employees designated as "special police" under the United States Code (Title 10, Chapter 63, §6306). These officers patrol Smithsonian property in New York, Virginia, and the District of Columbia. Smithsonian Special Police Officers carry firearms, mace and handcuffs and have arrest authority on federal Smithsonian property.

Texas
The Texas Special Police were formed along with the Texas State Police during the administration of Texas Governor Edmund J. Davis on July 22, 1870, to combat crime statewide in Texas. There were thirty special policemen assigned as auxiliary officers throughout the state. On April 22, 1873, the law authorizing the state police was repealed by the newly elected Democratic-controlled state legislature.

Texas state law authorizes mayors to appoint special police officers to enforce the municipality's laws, avert danger, or protect life or property; because of riot, outbreak, calamity, or public disturbance; or because of threat of serious violation of law or order, of outbreak, or of other danger to the municipality or its inhabitants. (§ 341.011. SPECIAL POLICE FORCE IN TYPE A GENERAL-LAW)

Virginia
Virginia possesses special police officers employed, typically, in the private police field. These officers are regulated by the Virginia Department of Criminal Justice Services and are termed special conservators of the peace (SCOP). These officers must meet specific training requirements and be sworn in by the district court judge or magistrate in the area where they request a commission. These officers, when so sworn and certified, are permitted to utilize the term 'police' (this was removed by the state legislature in 2018 and they may no longer use the term) and are permitted to operate emergency vehicles equipped with red flashing/strobing lights (municipal law enforcement operates either blue or combinations of blue and red).

This class of officers should not be confused with armed security officers who in Virginia possess arrest authority on the property they are employed to protect. Armed security officers do not have fresh pursuit authority (off of their grounds/property) whereas SCOP officers do.

Washington, D.C.
Washington utilizes special police in both the public and private security sectors. Most work for private security companies although many security officers in the Washington, D.C., area also have special police status. Special police are required to be licensed and are appointed by the Mayor.

Spain

GEO

Catalonia
Operations jurisdiction:

GEI Special intervention group (GEI) in Catalan: Grup Especial d'Intervenció. this area It was created in 1984 with the collaboration of the Spezialeinsatzkommando (SEK) of Germany.

Vietnam
The Ministry of Public Security has a High Command of Mobile Police Force. It includes six regiments of mobile police and three battalions of special police.

See also
Constable
Special constable
Special constabulary
Specialist law enforcement agency
List of special police units

References

External links
 Article from San Francisco Chronicle

Law enforcement occupations
Law enforcement units